Two Fires is the fourth studio album by the Australian rock singer Jimmy Barnes, and his first United States release for Atlantic Records. It was released in Australia by Mushroom Records and was his fifth consecutive No. 1 album, peaking on release in September 1990 and remaining at the position for four weeks. On 16 June 1991, Two Fires again reached No. 1, making it the only Barnes album to achieve such a feat. The title track, "Between Two Fires", was co-written with the hit songwriter, Holly Knight, it also includes a bonus track "Stick To Your Guns".

Track listing
 "Lay Down Your Guns" (Jimmy Barnes, Rick Nowels)
 "Let's Make It Last All Night" (Barnes, Diane Warren, Desmond Child)
 "Little Darling" (Barnes)
 "Love Is Enough" (Barnes, Marvin Etzioni, Sandford, Thomas, Froggatt)
 "Hardline" (Barnes, Tony Brock, Jay Williams, Savigar)
 "One of a Kind" (Barnes, Brock, Williams, Savigar)
 "Sister Mercy" (Barnes, Ross Wilson, Neill)
 "When Your Love is Gone" (Barnes, Brock, Savigar)
 "Between Two Fires" (Barnes, Holly Knight)
 "Fade to Black" (Barnes, Bailey)
 "Hold On" (Barnes, Brock, Williams)
 "Stick To Your Guns" (Bonus Track (Barnes)

Outtakes
A demo recording session in July 1989 produced 12 several tracks which were not included in the final album and which remain unreleased.
"Ain't That Just Like Love"
"All Is Forgiven"
"Body and Soul"
"Crazy World"
"Don't Make Me Wait"
"Give and Take"
"Glory Bound"
"Jealousy"
"Killer Love"
"Love is For Nothing"
"Rock Me Over" 
"Testify"Certain songs from the Two Fires'' sessions did not make the final album, but appeared as B-sides of the album's singles. These include:

"Broken Hearts" (B-side of "Lay Down Your Guns")
"No Frills" (B-side of "Little Darling")
"Bad News" (B-side of "Let's Make It Last All Night")

Personnel
Jimmy Barnes - vocals
Jeff Neill, Mark Lizotte, Brian Setzer, Todd Sharp, Wally Stocker - guitar
Jimmy Haslip - bass
Tony Brock - drums
Kevin Savigar - keyboards
Eliza-Jane 'E.J.' Barnes, Jackie Barnes, Jane Barnes, Jimmy Barnes, Mahalia Barnes, Spencer Brock, Taylor Brock, Tony Brock, Leanne D'Hudson, Wendy Fraser, Grace Gehman, Portia Griffin, Marcy Levy, Jeff Neill, Brian Setzer, Todd Sharp, Jade Thacker, Nicholas Thacker, Sue Thacker, Tyler Thacker - backing vocals
Technical
Rick O'Neil - mastering engineer

Charts

Weekly charts

Year-end charts

Sales and certifications

See also
 List of number-one albums in Australia during the 1990s

References

1990 albums
Jimmy Barnes albums
Albums produced by Don Gehman
Mushroom Records albums